Jennifer O’Mara (born November 12, 1989) is a Democratic member of the Pennsylvania House of Representatives, representing the 165th Legislative District. The district includes parts of Springfield Township, Marple Township, Radnor Township and the borough of Morton.

Early life and education
The oldest of three children, O’Mara was born in Southwest Philadelphia. She moved to Delaware County with her mother and siblings after her father, a Philadelphia firefighter, died by gun suicide. O’Mara cites the importance of her father's pension and public program such as CHIP in supporting her family while she was a teenager. She graduated from the Interboro High School in 2007 and became the first in her family to attend college. She earned a Bachelor of Arts degree in History and a certificate in Secondary Education from West Chester University in 2011. She received a Master’s degree in liberal arts from the University of Pennsylvania in 2017.

Pennsylvania House of Representatives

Elections

2018 

On , O'Mara launched her campaign for the 165th District. The district had never elected a Democratic representative before, and had previously been represented by one-term Republican Alex Charlton.

O'Mara was unopposed in the Democratic primary, while Charlton defeated primary challenger Regina Scheerer with 65.72% of the Republican vote. O'Mara upset Charlton in the 2018 general election, becoming the first Democrat and first woman to represent the district.

2020 

O'Mara ran for re-election in 2020. She was unopposed in the Democratic primary and faced Republican Robert Smythe Jr. in the general election. O'Mara retained her seat by defeating Smythe with 51.51% of the vote.

Results

Tenure 
O'Mara was sworn in on January 1, 2019, and was elected first vice-chair for the Democratic Caucus's Southeast delegation.

Committee assignments 

Veterans Affairs & Emergency Preparedness
Transportation
Aging and Older Adult Services

References

External links

Living people
People from Delaware County, Pennsylvania
Democratic Party members of the Pennsylvania House of Representatives
Women in Pennsylvania politics
Women state legislators in Pennsylvania
21st-century American politicians
West Chester University alumni
1989 births
21st-century American women politicians